The second and final season of the American television series La Doña was confirmed by Telemundo in May 2019.  The season is starring an ensemble cast headed by Aracely Arambula, Carlos Ponce, and David Zepeda.

Cast

Main 
 Aracely Arámbula as Altagracia Sandoval "La Doña"
 Carlos Ponce as León Contreras
 David Zepeda as José Luis Navarrete
 Maricela González as Eunice Lara "La Felina" (character from El Señor de los Cielos)
 Kika Edgar as Romelia Vega
 Patricia Reyes Spíndola as Florencia Molina 
 Alejandra Barros as Eleonora Rojas de Navarrete
 Paola Fernández as Noelia Molina 
 José Sefami as Alfonso Cabral
 Andrea Martí as Regina Sandoval
 José María Galeano as Braulio Padilla / Ernesto Palmar
 Fernanda Borches as Fátima Escamilla
 Leo Deluglio as Diego Padilla
 Diego Soldano as Daniel Llamas
 Simone Victoria as Magdalena Sánchez
 Claudio Roca as Adolfo Mendoza
 Mayra Sierra as Karen Velarde
 Alexa Martín as Fernanda Céspedes
 Alberto Casanova as Mauricio Preciado
 Paola Albo as Isabela Sandoval
 Bernardo Flores as Lucho Navarrete
 Agustín Argüello as Eduardo Pérez
 Aquiles Cervantes as Matamoros
 Diego Escalona as Ángel Contreras
 Cuauhtli Jiménez as Fernando "Nando" Valles
 Rafael Ernesto as Sebastián Céspedes
 Juan Pablo De Santiago
 Christian Ramos as Cisco
 Leandro Lima as Thiago
 Eric del Castillo as Ricardo Vidal

Recurring and guest 
 Danna Paola as Mónica Eulalia Hernandez
 Francisco Rubio as Andrés Roldán
 Luis Xavier as Don Manuel Padilla
 Matías Novoa as Amado Casillas "El Águila Azul" (character from El Señor de los Cielos)

Production 
On 14 May 2018, Aracely Arámbula announced through her Instagram account that La Doña had been renewed for a second season. It was not until a year later, on 9 May 2019 that Telemundo made the announcement official. On 22 August 2019, People en Español magazine confirmed the entire cast that would be in the second season. It was also confirmed that David Chocarro would no longer be part of the cast, and that Danna Paola would only have a guest role due to her commitment to the Élite series. The actors who did retake their character from the previous season are José María Galeano, Andrea Martí, Diego Soldano, Leo Deluglio, Simone Victoria, Mayra Sierra, and Aquiles Cervantes.

Reception 
The season premiered on 13 January 2020 with a total of 1 million viewers, and 470 thousand adults between 18-49 years, according to Nielsen Data released by PRODU. Despite this, the season failed to beat the Turkish series Kara Sevda of Univision, and during its first week on air, it failed to reach one million viewers.

Episodes

Notes

References 

2020 American television seasons
2020 Mexican television seasons